"What If" was the second and last single released from 112's 2005 album, Pleasure & Pain. Slim sings lead on the song.

Track listing
"What If" (Radio Edit) — 3:16
"What If" (Instrumental) — 3:16
"What If" (Call Out) — 1:16

Weekly charts

References

2005 singles
112 (band) songs
Def Jam Recordings singles
Contemporary R&B ballads
2005 songs
Songs written by Darrell "Delite" Allamby